Al Joseph Woods (born March 25, 1987) is an American football nose tackle for the Seattle Seahawks of the National Football League (NFL). He was drafted by the New Orleans Saints in the fourth round of the 2010 NFL Draft. He played college football at LSU. Woods has also been a member of the Tampa Bay Buccaneers, Pittsburgh Steelers, Tennessee Titans, and Indianapolis Colts.

Professional career

Woods was projected to be drafted in the third round of the 2010 NFL Draft by NFLDraftScout.com.

New Orleans Saints
Woods was drafted by the New Orleans Saints in the fourth round (123rd overall) of the 2010 NFL Draft.  He signed a four-year contract on July 15, 2010. He was released on September 4, 2010.

Pittsburgh Steelers
On September 7, 2010, Woods was signed to the Pittsburgh Steelers' practice squad. According to Profootball.com he played in 9 games in 2010 for them.

Tampa Bay Buccaneers
On November 2, 2010, Woods was signed off the Steelers' practice squad by the Tampa Bay Buccaneers. He was cut on September 3, 2011.

Seattle Seahawks
Woods was claimed off waivers by the Seattle Seahawks on September 4, 2011. He was waived on November 8.

Pittsburgh Steelers (second stint)
The Pittsburgh Steelers claimed him off of waivers on November 9, 2011. Woods played in 12 games during the 2012 season and the full 2013 season, starting in two.

Tennessee Titans
Woods signed with the Tennessee Titans on March 12, 2014.

On March 8, 2017, Woods was released by the Titans    after 42 games, including 17 starts.

Indianapolis Colts
On March 16, 2017, Woods signed with the Indianapolis Colts. He started all 16 games, recording a career-high 44 tackles and one sack.

In 2018, Woods played in 14 games with eight games recording 24 tackles. He was placed on injured reserve on December 18, 2018.

Seattle Seahawks (second stint)
On May 10, 2019, Woods signed a one-year contract with the Seahawks. On December 20, 2019, Woods was suspended four games for violating the NFL policy on performance-enhancing substances. He was reinstated from suspension on January 13, 2020.

Jacksonville Jaguars
On April 8, 2020, Woods was signed by the Jacksonville Jaguars to a one-year, $2.75 million deal. On July 31, 2020, Woods announced he would opt out of the 2020 season due to the COVID-19 pandemic. He was released after the season on March 17, 2021.

Seattle Seahawks (third stint)
On April 5, 2021, Woods signed a one-year, $3 million contract with a $750,000 signing bonus to return to Seattle for the third time. He was a full-time starter in 2021, starting 16 games recording a career-high 50 tackles, three passes defensed, 11 QB pressures and 1.5 sacks.

On March 17, 2022, Woods re-signed with the Seahawks.

On September 5, 2022, Woods was named team captain for the Seahawks defenese.

Woods played and started 14 games for the Seahawks in 2022 and logged a career high 2.0 sacks.

References

External links
Seattle Seahawks bio
Tennessee Titans bio 
Pittsburgh Steelers bio 
New Orleans Saints bio 
LSU Tigers bio

1987 births
Living people
People from Jennings, Louisiana
Players of American football from Louisiana
American football defensive tackles
LSU Tigers football players
New Orleans Saints players
Pittsburgh Steelers players
Tampa Bay Buccaneers players
Seattle Seahawks players
Tennessee Titans players
Indianapolis Colts players
Jacksonville Jaguars players